Archer class may refer to:
 , a class of patrol and training vessel of the Royal Navy
 , a class of submarines of the Republic of Singapore Navy
 , a 19th-century class of Royal Navy screw sloop
 Archer-class (1801 batch) gun brigs, 18th-century Royal Navy gun brigs
 Archer-class (1804 batch) gun brigs, 18th-century Royal Navy gun brigs
 Archer (character class), a fantasy archetype

See also
 Archer (disambiguation)
 Archer (ship)